The V Reserve Corps was a corps level command of the German Army in World War I.

Formation 
V Reserve Corps was formed on the outbreak of the war in August 1914 as part of the mobilisation of the Army.  It was initially commanded by General der Infanterie Erich von Gündell, brought out of retirement.  It was still in existence at the end of the war in the 5th Army, Heeresgruppe Gallwitz on the Western Front.

Structure on formation 
On formation in August 1914, V Reserve Corps consisted of two divisions, made up of reserve units.  In general, Reserve Corps and Reserve Divisions were weaker than their active counterparts
Reserve Infantry Regiments did not always have three battalions nor necessarily contain a machine gun company
Reserve Jäger Battalions did not have a machine gun company on formation
Reserve Cavalry Regiments consisted of just three squadrons
Reserve Field Artillery Regiments usually consisted of two abteilungen of three batteries each
Corps Troops generally consisted of a Telephone Detachment and four sections of munition columns and trains 

In summary, V Reserve Corps mobilised with 22 infantry battalions, 7 machine gun companies (42 machine guns), 6 cavalry squadrons, 12 field artillery batteries (72 guns) and 3 pioneer companies.  10th Reserve Division was slightly stronger than the norm as it included an active infantry brigade.

Combat chronicle 
On mobilisation, V Reserve Corps was assigned to the 5th Army forming part of the centre of the forces for the Schlieffen Plan offensive in August 1914.

Commanders 
V Reserve Corps had the following commanders during its existence:

See also 

German Army order of battle (1914)
German Army order of battle, Western Front (1918)

References

Bibliography 
 
 
 
 

Corps of Germany in World War I
Military units and formations established in 1914
Military units and formations disestablished in 1918